Snap parliamentary elections were held in Montenegro on 14 October 2012. The parliamentary elections were the ninth since the reintroduction of multi-party system in 1990, and the third since regaining full independence in 2006. The result was a victory for the ruling European Montenegro alliance (based around the Democratic Party of Socialists) led by Milo Đukanović, which won 39 of the 81 seats, remaining without the majority by itself for the first time since the 2001 election, and subsequently forming a majority coalition government with the ethnic minority Bosniak Party (BS) and Croatian Civic Initiative (HGI) parties.

Electoral system

The 81 members of Parliament were elected by proportional representation from a single nationwide constituency with an electoral threshold of 3%, although the threshold was reduced to 0.7% for ethnic minority parties in districts where ethnic minorities accounted for at least 15% of the population. For ethnic Croats, the electoral list wins one seat if it receives more than 0.35% of the popular vote. Seats were distributed using the D'Hondt method, which slightly favors larger lists.

Electoral lists
Several coalitions were formed or continued for the election:

Opinion polls
Poll results are listed in the table below in reverse chronological order, showing the most recent first, and using the date the survey's fieldwork was done, as opposed to the date of publication. If such date is unknown, the date of publication is given instead. The highest percentage figure in each polling survey is displayed in bold, and the background shaded in the leading party's colour. In the instance that there is a tie, then no figure is shaded. The lead column on the right shows the percentage-point difference between the two parties with the highest figures. When a specific poll does not show a data figure for a party, the party's cell corresponding to that poll is shown empty. The threshold for a party to elect members is 3%.

Results

References

Elections in Montenegro
Montenegro
Parliamentary
Montenegro